Imljani is a village in Republika Srpska, which is located in the municipality of Kneževo. Since 1954, Imljani was one of local communities of Former Šiprage Municipality in Former Kotor Varoš County.

Imljani consists of a few hamlets spreading on the lower vlašić's plateau, above the canyons of Ilomska and Ugar rivers. Actually, it covers the sub-plateau in the area of the angle between Korićanske stijene and Ugarske stijene ("Rocks of Ugar").

Central hamlet the Vidovište is on (around) 1200 meters above sea level. Around Vidovište, from Kobilja river (south-west) to Ilomska's canyon (north-east) there are the hamlets, as follows - North-eastern: Rijeka, Potok, Ponorci, Osredok, Benići, Škeljići, Pušići, Marići, Đenići and Đekin Do; South-western: Vujinovići, Makarići, Kelemeni, Novakovići, Šodolovići and Borje.

Traditional women costumes (front and back) in Imljani (Hamlet Grubači, ≈1810)

Ethnic composition, 1991 census

Demography

See also 
Skender Vakuf
Ilomska
Ugar
Korićanske stijene

References 

Kneževo, Bosnia and Herzegovina
Villages in Republika Srpska